Mufid Allawanseh (born August 14, 1970) is a Jordanian sport shooter. He placed 50th in the men's 50 metre rifle prone event at the 2000 Summer Olympics.

References

1970 births
Living people
ISSF rifle shooters
Jordanian male sport shooters
Olympic shooters of Jordan
Shooters at the 2000 Summer Olympics
Shooters at the 2002 Asian Games
Asian Games competitors for Jordan
21st-century Jordanian people